The Jain Center of America (JCA) was the first Jain temple organized and registered in America, in 1976, and is the oldest Jain temple in the Western hemisphere. The temple is located at 43-11 Ithaca Street, in Elmhurst, Queens, New York City.
 The temple houses shrines for Mahavir in the Śvētāmbara tradition, Rishabhanatha in the Digambar tradition, Upashraya in the Sthanakvasi tradition and a meditation hall for the Shrimad Rajchandra tradition.

The temple can accommodate over 500 people at one time. The most distinctive and unique feature of the JCA Temple is the manner in which it has managed to unite of the Jain faith under one roof, with each tradition having its own worshipping space, to preserve their unique tradition and identity and at the same time foster greater harmony and unity among all its members.

History
The plans for a Jain temple, the very first in the western hemisphere, were announced in 1973 by Prof. Narendra Sethi, a professor of Management at St. John's University, then the president of the Jain Center of New York, at a Diwali celebration, where Gurudev Chitrabhanu was the main speaker. This was the year of 2500th Nirvana anniversary of Lord Mahavira, the temples projected cost was to be $250,000.

The Jain Center of America - New York (JCA) was the first Jain Center registered in USA in 1976. In its early years, the JCA NY Center had no place to worship. In 1981, the center acquired its first temple building in the borough of Queens, New York. In June 2005, the JCA NY celebrated its Pratishta Mahotsav in the newly constructed temple at 43-11 Ithaca St, Elmhurst, Queens, NY, replacing the original 1981 structure.

Gallery

See also

Jainism in America
Jain Center of Southern California
JAINA
Brampton Jain Temple

References

External links

Indian-American culture in New York City
Jain temples in the United States
2005 establishments in New York City
Elmhurst, Queens
Religious buildings and structures in New York City
Religious buildings and structures completed in 2005
Religious organizations established in 1976
1976 establishments in New York City
20th-century Jain temples
Temples in New York (state)